In mathematics, Cartan's lemma refers to a number of results named after either Élie Cartan or his son Henri Cartan:
 In exterior algebra: Suppose that v1, ..., vp are linearly independent elements of a vector space V and w1, ..., wp are such that

in ΛV.  Then there are scalars hij = hji such that

so that .  Let K2, ..., Kn be simply connected domains in C and let

so that again .

in K.

 In potential theory, a result that estimates the Hausdorff measure of the set on which a logarithmic Newtonian potential is small.  See Cartan's lemma (potential theory).

References

Lemmas